Valérie Guignabodet (9 May 1965 – 23 February 2016) was a French film director and screenwriter. She studied at Emlyon Business School, and directed four films between 2002 and 2009, including Danse avec lui in 2007, and the television series Sam in 2016.

References

External links

1965 births
Emlyon Business School alumni
French women film directors
French women screenwriters
French screenwriters
Film people from Paris
2016 deaths